Paul Kenneth Bernardo (born August 27, 1964) is a Canadian serial rapist and serial killer dubbed the Scarborough Rapist, the Schoolgirl Killer and, together with his former wife Karla Homolka, one of the Ken and Barbie Killers. He is known for initially committing a series of rapes in Scarborough, Ontario, a suburb of Toronto, between 1987 and 1990, before committing three murders with Homolka; among these victims was Karla's younger sister, Tammy Homolka. 

After his capture and conviction, Bernardo was sentenced to life imprisonment and was later declared a dangerous offender, thus making it unlikely that he will ever be released from prison. Following his conviction, Bernardo confessed to ten more rapes committed a year before the spree ascribed to the Scarborough Rapist. Karla Homolka was given a lighter sentence in exchange for testifying against Bernardo as part of a controversial plea bargain; she was released from prison in 2005.

Early life
Paul Bernardo was born in Scarborough, Ontario, on August 27, 1964, the third and legally youngest child of Kenneth Walter Bernardo and Marilyn Elizabeth Bernardo (née Eastman). Bernardo's father often sexually abused his older sister, Debra, in front of other family members, and would eventually be charged with crimes involving voyeurism and paedophilia. Bernardo's mother often withdrew from her family due to depression and agoraphobia, eventually moving into the basement. 

Bernardo presented himself as being a happy and well-adjusted child despite his family's dysfunction, and was an active member of the Boy Scouts. Beneath the charming facade, however, he gradually developed pyromaniac inclinations and dark sexual fantasies, one of which involved creating a "virgin farm" where he would breed virgin girls to rape. 

After a fight between his parents in 1981, Bernardo, then aged 16, was informed by his mother that he was the result of an extramarital affair and that Kenneth was not his biological father. Repulsed, Bernardo began to call his mother "slut" and "whore"; she reciprocated by calling him a "bastard from hell". Later, after growing weary of Bernardo's domineering behavior, his first girlfriend left him for one of his friends. In retaliation, Bernardo set fire to all items in his possession that belonged to his girlfriend.

Bernardo attended Sir Wilfrid Laurier Collegiate Institute and, in 1982, the University of Toronto Scarborough (UTSC), where another notorious Canadian murderer, Russell Williams, was coincidentally two academic years behind him. As his day job, Bernardo worked for Amway, the sales culture of which deeply affected him: "He bought the books and tapes of famous motivational get-rich-and-famous experts." 

Bernardo and his college friends practised pickup techniques on young women they met in bars and were fairly successful. Bernardo delighted in humiliating his dates in public and engaging in aggressive anal intercourse in bed. His relationships became increasingly violent and unstable, and his partners were threatened with death if they disclosed the abuse. In 1986, Bernardo was served with restraining orders by two women after he made obscene phone calls. 

In October 1987, Bernardo met Karla Homolka while she was visiting Scarborough to attend a pet store conference. The two shared an immediate attraction, as Homolka encouraged Bernardo's sadistic sexual behavior.

Scarborough Rapist cases 
Between 1987 and 1990, Bernardo committed increasingly vicious serial rapes in and around Scarborough. He attacked most of his victims after stalking them as they got off buses late in the evening. Known incidents are:

 May 4, 1987: Rape of a 21-year-old Scarborough woman in front of her parents' house after Bernardo followed her home.
 May 14, 1987: Rape of a 19-year-old woman in the backyard of her parents' house.
 July 17, 1987: Attempted rape of a young woman. Although he beat the victim, Bernardo abandoned the attack when she fought back.
 September 29, 1987: Attempted rape of a 15-year-old girl. Bernardo broke into the victim's house and entered her bedroom. He jumped on her back, put his hand over her mouth, threatened her with a knife, bruised the side of her face and bit her ear. Bernardo fled when the victim's mother entered the room and screamed. Anthony Hanemaayer was wrongfully convicted of the assault in 1989 and served a sixteen-month prison sentence, but was exonerated after Bernardo admitted to the crime in 2006.
 December 16, 1987: Rape of a 15-year-old girl. The next day, the Toronto Police Service issued a warning to women in Scarborough traveling alone at night, especially those riding buses.
 December 23, 1987: Rape of a 17-year-old girl with a knife he used to threaten his victims. At this point, he began to be known as the Scarborough Rapist.
 April 18, 1988: Attack of a 17-year-old girl.
 May 25, 1988: Bernardo was nearly caught by a uniformed police officer staking out a bus shelter. Although officer noticed him hiding under a tree and pursued him on foot, Bernardo escaped.
 October 4, 1988: Attempted rape in Scarborough. Although his intended victim fought him off, Bernardo inflicted two stab wounds to her thigh and buttock which required twelve stitches.
 November 16, 1988: Rape of an 18-year-old woman in the backyard of her parents' house.
 November 17, 1988: Police formed a task force to capture the Scarborough Rapist.
 December 27, 1988: Attempted rape, with a neighbour chasing Bernardo off.
 June 20, 1989: Attempted rape; the young woman fought, and her screams alerted neighbours. Bernardo fled with scratches on his face.
 August 15, 1989: Rape of a 22-year-old woman.
 November 21, 1989: Rape of a 15-year-old girl Bernardo saw in a bus shelter.
 December 22, 1989: Rape of a 19-year-old woman.
 May 26, 1990: Rape of a 19-year-old woman. The victim's vivid recollection of her attacker enabled police to create a computer composite portrait, which was released two days later by police and publicized in Toronto and surrounding areas.
 July 1990: Two months after police received tips that Bernardo resembled the Scarborough Rapist composite, he was interviewed by two police detectives.

Investigation and release 
From May to September 1990, Toronto police submitted more than 130 suspects' samples for DNA testing. Investigators received two tips pointing to Bernardo. The first, in June, had been filed by a bank employee. The second was from Tina Smirnis, wife of one of the three Smirnis brothers who were among Bernardo's closest friends. Smirnis told detectives that Bernardo "had been 'called in' on a previous rape investigation – once in December, 1987 – but he had never been interviewed". Bernardo frequently talked about his sex life to Smirnis and said that he liked rough sex.

Police interviewed Bernardo on November 20, 1990, for thirty-five minutes. Bernardo voluntarily provided DNA samples for forensic testing. When the detectives asked Bernardo why he thought he was being investigated for the rapes, he admitted that he resembled the composite. Reportedly, detectives found Bernardo more credible than Smirnis.

Schoolgirl Killer murders

Tammy Homolka 

By 1990, Bernardo had lost his job as an accountant and was smuggling cigarettes across the nearby Canada–United States border. He spent long periods of time with Homolka's family, who liked him and were unaware of his criminal activities. Although he was engaged to Karla, he had become obsessed with her younger sister Tammy, peering into her window and entering her room to masturbate while she slept. Karla helped Bernardo by breaking the windows in her sister's room, allowing him access. According to Bernardo's testimony at trial, Karla laced spaghetti sauce with crushed valium she had stolen from her employer at an animal clinic. She served it to her sister, who soon lost consciousness. Bernardo then raped Tammy while Karla watched. After one minute, Tammy regained consciousness.

Six months before their 1991 wedding, Karla stole the anesthetic agent halothane from the clinic. On December 23, 1990, Karla and Bernardo administered sleeping pills to 15-year-old Tammy in a rum-and-eggnog cocktail. When Tammy lost consciousness, Karla and Bernardo undressed her and Karla applied a halothane-soaked cloth to her sister's nose and mouth. Karla wanted to "give Tammy's virginity to Bernardo for Christmas"; according to her, Bernardo was disappointed that he was not Karla's first sex partner. With Tammy's parents sleeping upstairs, the couple videotaped themselves raping Tammy in the basement. Tammy began to vomit; they tried to revive her and called 9-1-1 after hiding evidence, dressing Tammy and moving her into her bedroom. A few hours later, Tammy was pronounced dead at St. Catharines General Hospital without regaining consciousness.

Despite being observed vacuuming and washing laundry in the middle of the night, and despite a chemical burn on Tammy's face, the Regional Municipality of Niagara coroner and Karla's family accepted the couple's version of events. The official cause of Tammy's death was ruled accidental, the result of choking on vomit after consumption of alcohol. After Tammy's death, Bernardo and Karla videotaped themselves engaging in sexual intercourse, with Karla wearing Tammy's clothing and pretending to be her. They moved out of the Homolka house to a rented bungalow in Port Dalhousie to allow Karla's parents to grieve.

Leslie Mahaffy

Early in the morning on June 15, 1991, while detouring through Burlington to steal license plates, Bernardo came across 14-year-old Leslie Mahaffy. Mahaffy had been locked out of her house for missed curfew after attending a friend's wake. Bernardo left his car and approached Mahaffy, saying that he wanted to break into a neighbour's house. Unfazed, she asked if he had any cigarettes. When Bernardo led her to his car he blindfolded her, forced her into the car, drove her to Port Dalhousie and informed Homolka that they had a victim.

Bernardo and Homolka videotaped themselves torturing and sexually abusing Mahaffy while they listened to pop music. At one point Bernardo said, "You're doing a good job, Leslie, a damned good job", adding: "The next two hours are going to determine what I do to you. Right now, you're scoring perfect." On another segment of tape played at Bernardo's trial, the assault escalated. Mahaffy cried out in pain and begged Bernardo to stop. In the Crown description of the scene, he was sodomizing her while her hands were bound with twine.

Mahaffy later told Bernardo that her blindfold seemed to be slipping, which signaled the possibility that she could identify her attackers if she lived. The following day, Bernardo claimed, Homolka fed her a lethal dose of Halcion; Homolka claimed that Bernardo strangled her. They put Mahaffy's body in their basement the day before Homolka's family had dinner at the house. 

Following the dinner party, Bernardo and Homolka decided to dismember Mahaffy's body and encase each part of her remains in cement. Bernardo bought a dozen bags of cement at a hardware store the following day; he kept the receipts, which were damaging at his trial. At least one of the blocks weighed 90 kg (200 pounds) and was beyond their ability to sink. It lay near the shore, where it was found on June 29, 1991, coincidentally on Bernardo and Homolka's wedding day. Mahaffy's orthodontic appliance was instrumental in identifying her.

Several days before Homolka's release from prison in July 2005, Bernardo was interviewed by police and his lawyer, Tony Bryant. According to Bryant, Bernardo stated that he had always intended to free the girls he and Homolka had kidnapped. However, when Mahaffy's blindfold fell off, Homolka was concerned that Mahaffy would identify Bernardo and report the couple to the police. Bernardo claimed that Homolka planned to murder Mahaffy by injecting an air bubble into her bloodstream, triggering an air embolism.

Kristen French

During the after-school hours of April 16, 1992, Bernardo and Homolka drove through St. Catharines to look for potential victims. Although students were still going home, the streets were generally empty. As they passed Holy Cross Secondary School, the couple spotted 15-year-old Kristen French walking  home. After they pulled into the parking lot of nearby Grace Lutheran Church, Homolka got out of the car carrying a map, pretending to need assistance. When French looked at the map, Bernardo attacked from behind and forced her into the front seat of the car at knifepoint. From the back seat, Homolka subdued French by pulling her hair.

After French failed to arrive home, her parents became convinced that she met with foul play and notified police. Within twenty-four hours the Niagara Regional Police Service (NRP) assembled a team, searched French's after-school route and found several witnesses who had seen the abduction from different locations. French's shoe, recovered from the parking lot, underscored the seriousness of the abduction.

Over the Easter weekend, Bernardo and Homolka videotaped themselves torturing, raping and sodomizing French, forcing her to drink large amounts of alcohol and submit to Bernardo. At his trial, Crown prosecutor Ray Houlahan said that Bernardo always intended to kill French because she was never blindfolded and could identify her captors. The following day, Bernardo and Homolka murdered French before going to the Homolkas' for Easter dinner. Homolka testified at her trial that Bernardo strangled French for seven minutes while she watched. Bernardo claimed that Homolka beat French with a rubber mallet because she tried to escape, and French was strangled with a noose around her neck which was secured to a hope chest; Homolka then went to fix her hair.

French's nude body was found on April 30, 1992, in a ditch in Burlington, about forty-five minutes from St. Catharines and a short distance from the cemetery where Mahaffy is buried. She had been washed and her hair was cut off. Although it was thought that the hair was removed as a trophy, Homolka testified that it was cut to impede identification.

Additional victims
In addition to the three confirmed murders ascribed to Bernardo and Homolka, suspicions remain about other possible victims or intended victims:
 Derek Finkle's 1997 book No Claim to Mercy presented evidence tying Bernardo to the presumed murder of 22-year-old Elizabeth Bain, who disappeared on June 19, 1990. Bain told her mother that she was going to "check the tennis schedule" at UTSC; three days later, her car was found with a large bloodstain on the back seat. Bernardo matched the description of a man in the Colonel Danforth Park area where Bain was last seen, and later confessed to at least eight attacks in and around the same park. Bain's boyfriend, Robert Baltovich, was convicted of second-degree murder in her death on March 31, 1992. During his trial and subsequent imprisonment, Baltovich and his lawyers repeatedly alleged that Bernardo was the perpetrator. The Court of Appeal for Ontario set aside Baltovich's conviction on December 2, 2004, and at his retrial on April 22, 2008, the Crown told the court that no evidence would be called against Baltovich and asked the jury to find him not guilty of second-degree murder. When questioned about the Bain killing in 2007, Bernardo said: “The answer to that is no. But the 800 pound gorilla in the room is that it is a life-to-25 sentence.”
 Shortly after Tammy Homolka's funeral, her parents left town and her sister Lori visited grandparents in Mississauga, leaving the house empty. According to author Stephen Williams, during the weekend of January 12, 1991, Bernardo abducted a girl, took her to the house, raped her while Karla watched and dropped her off on a deserted road near Lake Gibson. Bernardo and Homolka called her "January girl".
 At about 5:30 a.m. on April 6, 1991, Bernardo abducted a 14-year-old who was training to be a coxswain for a local rowing team. The girl was distracted by a blonde woman who waved at her from her car, enabling Bernardo to drag her into the shrubbery near the rowing club. He sexually assaulted her, forced her to remove her clothes and made her wait five minutes during which he disappeared.
 On June 7, 1991, Homolka invited a 15-year-old girl she had befriended at a pet shop two years earlier, known as "Jane Doe" in the trials, to their home. After being drugged by Homolka, "Doe" was sexually assaulted by the couple, which was videotaped. In August, "Doe" was invited back to the couple's residence and was again drugged. Homolka called 9-1-1 for help after the girl vomited and stopped breathing while being raped. The ambulance was recalled after Bernardo and Homolka resuscitated her.
 On July 28, 1991, Bernardo stalked Sydney Kershen, aged 21, after he saw her while driving home from work. On August 9, he resumed stalking her. This time she took evasive action, stopping at her boyfriend's house just prior to his arrival. After spotting Bernardo the boyfriend gave chase, came across Bernardo's gold Nissan and took note of the licence plate. The couple reported the incident to the NRP, which established that the car belonged to Bernardo. An NRP officer visited Bernardo's house and saw the car parked in the driveway but did not pursue the matter nor submitted an official police report.
 A newspaper clipping found during the police search of Bernardo's house described a rape that occurred in Hawaii during the couple's honeymoon there in the summer of 1991. The article, the rape's similarity to Bernardo's modus operandi and its occurrence during the couple's presence in Hawaii led police to speculate on Bernardo's involvement. Law enforcement officials in both Canada and the U.S. have stated their belief that Bernardo was responsible for this rape, but due to extradition issues this case was never prosecuted.
 On November 30, 1991, Terri Anderson, a grade nine student at Lakeport Secondary School (adjacent to French's Catholic school), vanished less than two kilometres from the parking lot where French would later be abducted. In April 1992, the NRP said they had no evidence to suggest a link. Anderson's body was ultimately found in the water at Port Dalhousie. The coroner saw no evidence of foul play, despite the difficulties of determining such factors in a body that had been in the water for six months. The coroner's ruling, that her death was by drowning, probably as a result of drinking beer and taking LSD, was controversial in light of the circumstances of the Mahaffy and French murders.
 On March 29, 1992, Bernardo stalked and videotaped sisters Shanna and Kerry Patrich from his car, following them to their parents' house. The sisters incorrectly recorded his licence plate number; Shanna reported the incident to the NRP on March 31, 1992, and was given an incident number should further information develop. On April 18, 1992, while French was still being held captice, Bernardo was spotted by Kerry while he had gone out to buy dinner and rent a movie. Despite failing to track him to his house. Kerry got a better description of his licence plate and car, which she reported to the NRP. This information, however, was mishandled by police.
 In 2006, Bernardo confessed to at least ten more sexual assaults dating to March 1986, including the 1987 assault of a 15-year-old girl. Another man, Anthony Hanemaayer, had been convicted of the assault and served a full sentence for it. On June 25, 2008, the Court of Appeal for Ontario overturned the conviction and exonerated Hanemaayer.

Investigation and arrest
Homolka and Bernardo were questioned by police several times in connection with the Scarborough Rapist investigation, Tammy Homolka's death, and Bernardo's stalking of other women before French's abduction. On May 12, 1992, Bernardo was briefly interviewed by an NRP sergeant and constable, who decided that he was an unlikely suspect despite his admission that he had previously been questioned in connection to the Scarborough Rapist. Three days later, the Green Ribbon Task Force was created to investigate the murders of Mahaffy and French. Bernardo and Homolka had applied to have their names legally changed to Teale, which Bernardo had taken from the serial killer in the 1988 film Criminal Law. At the end of May, John Motile, an acquaintance of Smirnis and Bernardo, reported Bernardo as a possible suspect in the murders.

In December 1992, the Centre of Forensic Sciences finally began testing DNA samples provided by Bernardo two years earlier. On 27 December, Bernardo severely beat Homolka with a flashlight, leaving multiple bruises. Claiming that she had been in an automobile accident, Homolka returned to work on 4 January 1993. Her skeptical co-workers called her parents, and although they rescued her the following day by physically removing her from Bernardo's house, Homolka went back in to frantically search for something. Homolka's parents took her to St. Catharines General Hospital, where she gave a statement to the NRP that she was a battered spouse and filed charges against Bernardo. He was arrested, and later released on his own recognizance. A friend who found Bernardo's suicide note intervened, and Homolka moved in with relatives in Brampton.

Arrest
Twenty-six months after Bernardo submitted a DNA sample, Toronto police were informed that it matched that of the Scarborough Rapist and immediately placed him under 24-hour surveillance. Metro Toronto Sexual Assault Squad investigators interviewed Homolka on February 9, 1993. Despite hearing their suspicions about Bernardo, she focused on his abuse of her. Later that night Homolka told her aunt and uncle that Bernardo was the Scarborough Rapist, that she and Bernardo were involved in the rape and murder of Mahaffy and French, and that the rapes were recorded on videotape. The NRP subsequently reopened its investigation of Tammy Homolka's death. Two days later Homolka met with Niagara Falls lawyer George Walker, who sought legal immunity from Crown prosecutor Houlahan in exchange for her cooperation. She was also placed under 24-hour surveillance.

The couple's name change was approved on February 13, 1993. The next day, Walker met with Crown Criminal Law Office director Murray Segal. After Walker told Segal about the videotapes, Segal advised him that, due to Homolka's involvement in the crimes, full immunity was not a possibility.

On February 17, detectives arrested Bernardo on several charges and obtained a search warrant. Because his link to the murders was weak, the warrant was limited; no evidence which was not expected and documented in the warrant could be removed from his property, and all videotapes found by police had to be viewed in the house. Damage had to be kept to a minimum; police could not tear down walls looking for the tapes. The search of the house (including updated warrants) lasted 71 days, and the only tape found by police had a brief segment of Homolka performing oral sex on "Jane Doe". During a call from jail, Bernardo told his lawyer, Ken Murray, that the rape videos were hidden in a ceiling light fixture in the upstairs bathroom. Murray found the tapes and hid them from investigators. After Murray resigned as Bernardo’s lawyer, his new attorney, John Rosen, turned the tapes over to police. 

On May 5, Walker was informed that the government was offering Homolka a plea bargain of twelve years' imprisonment which she had one week to accept. If she declined, the government would charge her with two counts of first-degree murder, one count of second-degree murder and other crimes. Walker accepted the offer, and Homolka later agreed to it. On May 14 Homolka's plea bargain was finalized, and she began giving statements to police investigators. She told police that Bernardo boasted that he had raped as many as thirty women, twice as many as the police suspected.

Publication ban
Citing the need to protect Bernardo's right to a fair trial, a publication ban was imposed on Homolka's preliminary inquiry. The Crown had applied for the ban, which was imposed on July 5 by Francis Kovacs of the Ontario Court of Justice. Through her lawyers, Homolka supported the ban; Bernardo's lawyers argued that he would be prejudged by the ban, since Homolka had been portrayed as his victim. Four media outlets and one author also opposed the ban. Some lawyers argued that rumours could damage the future trial process more than the publication of evidence. In February 1994, Homolka divorced Bernardo.

Public access to the Internet effectively nullified the court's order, as did proximity to the U.S.-Canada border. American journalists, not subject to the publication ban, published details of Homolka's testimony which were distributed by "electronic ban-breakers". Newspapers in Buffalo, Detroit, Washington, D.C., New York City and the United Kingdom, as well as radio and television stations close to the border, divulged the details. Canadians brought copies of The Buffalo News across the border, prompting orders to the NRP to arrest all those with more than one copy at the border; extra copies were confiscated. Copies of other newspapers, including The New York Times, were turned back at the border or not accepted by distributors in Ontario. Gordon Domm, a retired police officer who defied the publication ban by distributing details from foreign media, was convicted of two counts of contempt of court.

Trial, conviction, and incarceration
Bernardo was tried for the murders of French and Mahaffy in 1995, and his trial included detailed testimony from Homolka and videotapes of the rapes. Bernardo testified that the deaths were accidental, later claiming that Homolka was the actual killer. On September 1, 1995, Bernardo was convicted of a number of offences, including the two first-degree murders and two aggravated sexual assaults, and sentenced to life in prison without parole for at least twenty-five years. He was designated a dangerous offender, making him unlikely to ever be released.

Homolka's plea bargain was criticized by many Canadians since Bernardo's first defence lawyer, Ken Murray, had withheld the videotapes exposing Homolka's culpability for seventeen months. The videotapes were considered crucial evidence, and prosecutors said that they would never have agreed to the plea bargain if they had seen them. Murray was later acquitted of obstruction of justice and faced a disciplinary hearing by the Law Society of Upper Canada.

Although Bernardo was kept in the segregation unit at Kingston Penitentiary for his own safety, he was attacked and harassed; he was punched in the face by another inmate when he returned from a shower in 1996. In June 1999, five convicts tried to storm his segregation range and a riot squad used gas to disperse them.

On February 21, 2006, the Toronto Star reported that Bernardo had admitted sexually assaulting at least ten other women in attacks not previously attributed to him. Most were in 1986, a year before the spree attributed to the Scarborough Rapist. Authorities suspected Bernardo in other crimes, including a string of rapes in Amherst, New York, and the drowning of Terri Anderson in St. Catharines, but he has never acknowledged his involvement. His lawyer, Anthony G. Bryant, reportedly forwarded the information to legal authorities in November 2005.

In 2006, Bernardo gave a prison interview in which he claimed that he had reformed and would make a good parole candidate. He became eligible to petition a jury for early parole in 2008 under the faint hope clause (since he committed multiple murders before the 1997 criminal-code amendment) but did not do so. In 2015, Bernardo applied for day parole in Toronto. According to the victims' lawyer, Tim Danson, it is unlikely that Bernardo will ever be released in any capacity due to his dangerous offender status. In September 2013, Bernardo was transferred to Millhaven Institution in Bath, where he is reportedly segregated from other inmates.

In November 2015, Bernardo self-published A MAD World Order, a violent, fictional, 631-page e-book on Amazon. By November 15, the book was reportedly an Amazon bestseller, but was removed from the website due to a public outcry.

In October 2018, Bernardo had been set to go to trial for possession of a "shank" weapon while incarcerated. However, the prosecution dropped the charges due to their determination that there was no reasonable probability of conviction.

Bernardo became eligible for parole in February 2018. On October 17 of that year, he was denied day and full parole by the Parole Board of Canada. His next parole hearing took place on 22 June 2021; it took only one hour of deliberation by the presiding judge for his application to be turned down.

Law-enforcement review
After Bernardo's 1995 conviction, the Ontario government appointed Archie Campbell to review the roles played by the police services during the investigation. In his 1996 report, Campbell found that a lack of coordination, cooperation and communications by police and other elements of the judicial system contributed to a serial predator "falling through the cracks". One of Campbell's key recommendations was for an automated case-management system for Ontario's police services to use in investigations of homicides and sexual assaults. Ontario is the only place in the world with this type of computerized case-management network. Since 2002, all municipal police services and the Ontario Provincial Police have had access to this network, known as PowerCase.

Psychology
Bernardo scored 35 out of 40 on the Psychopathy Checklist, a psychological assessment tool used to assess the presence of psychopathy in individuals. This is classified as clinical psychopathy. Homolka, by contrast, scored 5 out of 40. At his October 17, 2018 parole meeting, evidence from expert psychiatric reports found that he had "deviant sexual interests and [he] met the diagnostic criteria of sexual sadism, voyeurism, and paraphilia not otherwise specified.” The reports furthermore stated that he "met the criteria for narcissistic personality disorder and [met the requirement for] a diagnosis of psychopathy,” meaning he was thereby "more likely to repeat violent sexual offending." The reports concluded that Bernardo "showed minimal insight into [his] offending, which is consistent with file information that suggests [he] has been keen over the years to come up with [his] own unsubstantiated reasons for [his] criminal behaviour.”

In popular culture
Episodes of Law & Order ("Fools for Love", season 10), Law & Order: Special Victims Unit ("Damaged", season 4 and "Pure", season 6), Close to Home ("Truly, Madly, Deeply", season 2) and The Inspector Lynley Mysteries (2007's "Know Thine Enemy") were inspired by the case. Under the Canadian publication ban in force at the time, "Fools for Love" could not be shown on Canadian television when it aired on February 23, 2000. The second episode of The Mentalist concerned a respectable, murderous husband-and-wife team. The Criminal Minds episode "Mr. and Mrs. Anderson" contains a serial-killer couple loosely based on Bernardo and Homolka, and the Bernardo case was mentioned by the Behavioral Analysis Unit team when they delivered their profile to the local police.
Dark Heart, Iron Hand, an MSNBC documentary rebroadcast as "To Love and To Kill" on MSNBC Investigates, concerned the case. In 2004, producers from Quantum Entertainment (a Los Angeles-based production company) announced the release of Karla, with the working title Deadly. Misha Collins portrayed Bernardo in the film alongside Laura Prepon, who starred as Karla Homolka.
The 1993 Rush song "Nobody's Hero" references the murder of a young girl in Port Dalhousie, drummer Neil Peart's hometown.

Another documentary  aired on the Discovery+ streaming service via the sub-channel Investigation Discovery entitled The Ken & Barbie Killers: The Lost Tapes. It premiered on December 12, 2021, and consisted of 4 episodes.

See also
 List of serial killers by country

References

Further reading

External links
 

1964 births
1988 murders in Canada
1989 murders in Canada
1990 murders in Canada
1991 murders in Canada
1992 murders in Canada
20th-century Canadian criminals
Canadian kidnappers
Canadian male criminals
Canadian murderers of children
Canadian people convicted of murder
Canadian prisoners sentenced to life imprisonment
Canadian rapists
Canadian serial killers
Crime in Toronto
Fugitives
Living people
Male serial killers
People convicted of murder by Canada
People from Scarborough, Toronto
People from St. Catharines
People with antisocial personality disorder
People with narcissistic personality disorder
People with sexual sadism disorder
Prisoners sentenced to life imprisonment by Canada
Publication bans in Canadian case law
Torture in Canada
University of Toronto alumni
Violence against women in Canada
Rape in the 1980s
Rape in the 1990s
Criminal duos